Nichole Denby (born 10 October 1982) is an American-Nigerian track and field athlete who specializes in the 100 meters hurdles. She represented the United States at the 2007 World Championships narrowly missing the final.

In 2014, she switched her allegiance to Nigeria, competing for the new nation at the 2014 Commonwealth Games, as well as 2014 African Championships where she won her first medal for Nigeria.

She has had personal bests of 12.54 seconds in the 100 metres hurdles (Eugene 2008) and 7.93 in the 60 metres hurdles (Boston 2007).

While running for North High School in Riverside, California, she was the 1999 and 2000 CIF California State Meet Champion in the 100 meters hurdles.  Her 13.20 win in 2000 set the National High School Record at the time.

Competition record

Exhibition Races

References

External links
USATF profile

1983 births
Living people
Nigerian female hurdlers
American female hurdlers
Nigerian people of African-American descent
People from Norman, Oklahoma
World Athletics Championships athletes for the United States
Athletes (track and field) at the 2014 Commonwealth Games
Commonwealth Games competitors for Nigeria